Brics is a locality located in the municipality of Olius, in Province of Lleida province, Catalonia, Spain. As of 2020, it has a population of 53.

Geography 
Brics is located 105km east-northeast of Lleida.

References

Populated places in the Province of Lleida